The 2019 Indiana Hoosiers football team represented Indiana University in the 2019 NCAA Division I FBS football season. The Hoosiers played their home games at Memorial Stadium in Bloomington, Indiana, and competed as a member of the East Division of the Big Ten Conference. The team was led by third-year head coach Tom Allen.

Spring Game
The 2019 Spring Game took place in Bloomington on April 12, 2019 at 7:00 p.m.

Previous season

The Hoosiers finished the 2018 season 5–7 overall, 2–7 in Big Ten play to finish in sixth place in the Eastern Division. The Hoosiers would fail to become bowl eligible, with Indiana's last bowl appearance coming in 2016.

Offseason

Coaching changes
On December 27, 2018, the Hoosiers announced the promotion of Kane Wommack from Linebacker's Coach to Defensive Coordinator; however, Wommack will continue linebacker coaching responsibilities. On December 30, 2018, Hoosiers' offensive coordinator Mike DeBord announced his retirement from football. On January 21, 2019, former Fresno State offensive coordinator Kalen DeBoer was announced as the Hoosiers' new offensive coordinator.

Departures
Notable departures from the 2018 squad included:

Transfers
The Hoosiers lost 2 players due to transfer:

2019 NFL Draft

Hoosiers who were picked in the 2019 NFL Draft:

Preseason

Position key

Recruits
The Hoosiers signed a total of 21 recruits.

Returning starters

Offense

Defense

Special teams

Preseason Big Ten poll
Although the Big Ten Conference has not held an official preseason poll since 2010, Cleveland.com has polled sports journalists representing all member schools as a de facto preseason media poll since 2011. For the 2019 poll, Indiana was projected to finish in fifth in the East Division.

Schedule
The Hoosiers' 2019 schedule will consist of 6 home games, 5 away games and 1 neutral site game in Indianapolis, Indiana. The Hoosiers' first non-conference game will be at Lucas Oil Stadium, in Indianapolis, against Ball State of the Mid-American Conference (MAC), before hosting the remaining two non-conference games; against Eastern Illinois from the Ohio Valley Conference (OVC) and against UConn of the American Athletic Conference (AAC).

The Hoosiers are scheduled to play nine conference games; they host Ohio State, Rutgers, Northwestern and Michigan. They will travel to Michigan State, Maryland, Nebraska, Penn State and Purdue.

Roster

Rankings

Game summaries

vs Ball State

vs Eastern Illinois (FCS)

vs No. 6 Ohio State

vs UConn

at No. 25 Michigan State

vs Rutgers

at Maryland

at Nebraska

vs Northwestern

at No. 9 Penn State

vs No. 13 Michigan

at Purdue

vs Tennessee (Gator Bowl)

Awards and honors

Award watch lists
Listed in the order that they were released

Players of the Week

B1G Conference Awards

Radio
Radio coverage for all games will be broadcast on IUHoosiers.com All-Access and on various radio frequencies throughout the state. The primary radio announcer is long-time broadcaster Don Fischer with Play-by-Play.

Players drafted into the NFL

References

Indiana
Indiana Hoosiers football seasons
Indiana Hoosiers football